Giampiero Branduardi (born 28 August 1936) is an Italian ice hockey player. He competed in the men's tournaments at the 1956 Winter Olympics and the 1964 Winter Olympics.

References

1936 births
Living people
Olympic ice hockey players of Italy
Ice hockey players at the 1956 Winter Olympics
Ice hockey players at the 1964 Winter Olympics
Ice hockey people from Milan